Fair Isle is an island in Shetland, in northern Scotland. It lies about halfway between mainland Shetland and Orkney. It is known for its bird observatory and a traditional style of knitting. The island has been owned by the National Trust for Scotland since 1954.

Geography

 the most remote inhabited island in the United Kingdom. It gives its name to one of the British Sea Areas. 

Most of the islanders live in the crofts on the southern half of the island, the northern half consisting of rocky moorland.

History

Fair Isle has been occupied since Neolithic times, which is remarkable given the lack of raw materials on the island, although it is surrounded by rich fishing waters. There are two known Iron Age sites: a promontory fort at Landberg and the foundations of a house underlying an early Christian settlement at Kirkigeo.

Most of the place names date from after the 9th-century Norse settlement of the Northern Isles. By that time the croft lands had clearly been in use for centuries.

Between the 9th and 15th centuries, Fair Isle was a Norwegian possession. In 1469, Shetland, along with Orkney, was part of the dowry of the King of Denmark's daughter, Margaret, on her marriage to James III of Scotland.

On 20 August 1588 the flagship of the Spanish Armada, El Gran Grifón, was shipwrecked in the cove of Stroms Hellier, forcing its 300 sailors to spend six weeks living with the islanders. The wreck was discovered in 1970. The large Canadian sailing ship Black Watch was wrecked on Fair Isle in 1877.

Fair Isle was bought by the National Trust for Scotland in 1954 from George Waterston, the founder of the bird observatory. In that decade, electricity was not yet available to residents and only some homes had running water; the population was declining at a level that created concern.

The population decreased steadily from about 400 in 1900. There were around 55 permanent residents on the island in 2015, the majority of whom were crofters. In April 2021, the population was 48 and the island became the first place in the UK all of whose adult inhabitants had been vaccinated against COVID-19. The island has 14 scheduled monuments, ranging from the earliest signs of human activity to the remains of a Second World War radar station. The two automated lighthouses are protected as listed buildings.

The island houses a series of high-technology relay stations carrying vital TV, radio, telephone and military communication links between Shetland, Orkney and the Scottish mainland. In this respect it continues its historic role as a signal station, linking the mainland and the more remote island groups. In 1976, when television relay equipment was updated to permit colour broadcasts to Shetland, the new equipment was housed in former Second World War radar station buildings on Fair Isle. Many television signals are relayed from Orkney to Shetland (rather than from the Scottish mainland) via Orkney's Keelylang Hill transmitter station.

Wartime military role 
During the Second World War, the Royal Air Force built a radar station on top of Ward Hill [] during the Battle of the Atlantic. The ruined buildings and Nissen huts are still present. A cable-operated narrow gauge railway lies disused, though it was once used to send supplies up to the summit of Ward Hill.

On 17 January 1941, a German Heinkel He 111 bomber, modified as a meteorological aircraft, crashed on the island; wreckage remains on the crash-site to the present day. The aircraft had been flying on a routine weather reconnaissance flight from its base at Oldenburg in Germany. It was intercepted by RAF Hawker Hurricane fighters from 3 Squadron, based at RAF Sumburgh; both of the aircraft's engines were damaged and several of the five crew were wounded. The pilot managed to make a crash-landing on Fair Isle to avoid ditching his crippled aircraft in the sea. Two crew died and three survived. The dead crew were buried in the island's churchyard; the survivors were detained by the islanders and remained for several days until weather conditions allowed them to be taken off the island by means of the Lerwick Lifeboat. Before the Lerwick boat reached the island, two separate boats from Orkney ran aground whilst making their way to collect the prisoners of war.

The South Light was a target. During raids, the wife of an assistant keeper was killed in 1941 and their daughter was injured; in 1942, the wife of another keeper and their daughter also died in a raid.

On 22 July 1941, Spitfire X5401 piloted by Flying Officer M. D. S. Hood crash-landed on Fair Isle returning from a reconnaissance mission over Ålesund, Norway. The pilot recalled the crash site to be adjacent to the track which crossed the airstrip. The cause of the crash proved to be a leak of coolant, which resulted in the engine overheating. The aircraft was recovered and flew again, and the pilot survived the war.

Economy
Over the centuries the island has changed hands many times. Trading links with Northern Europe are reflected in Fair Isle Haa, a traditional Hanseatic trading booth located not far from the South Harbour, traditionally used by residents of the southern part of the island. Rent was usually paid to absentee landlords (who rarely visited) in butter, cloth and fish oil.

Fishing has always been an important industry for the island. In 1702, the Dutch, who were interested in Shetland's herring fisheries, fought a naval battle against French warships just off the island.

Fair Isle is noted for its woollen jumpers, with knitting forming an important source of income for the women of the islands. The principal activity for the male islanders is crofting.

In January 2004, Fair Isle was granted Fairtrade Island status.

Bird life 
Many rare species of bird have been found on the island, with at least 27 species found on the island that were the first British records, and is probably the best place in western Europe to see skulking Siberian passerines such as Pechora pipit, lanceolated warbler and Pallas's grasshopper warbler. For example, in 2015, rare birds discovered on the island included pallid harrier, arctic warbler, Moltoni's warbler, booted warbler, paddyfield warbler, siberian thrush, and thrush nightingale.

The island is also home to an endemic subspecies of Eurasian wren, the Fair Isle wren Troglodytes troglodytes fridariensis.

Bird observatory 
In 1948, George Waterston founded a permanent bird observatory on the island. Because of its importance as a bird migration watchpoint, it provided most of the accommodation on the island. The first director of the observatory was Kenneth Williamson. It was unusual amongst bird observatories in providing catered, rather than hostel-style, accommodation.

In 2010, a new observatory was built: a wooden lodge of two storeys, which cost £4 million and accommodated around 30 guests. The 2010 observatory building was destroyed by fire on 10 March 2019; the observatory's records had been digitised and were not affected. The cost of rebuilding was estimated at £7.4m.

Infrastructure

Other than the restaurant of the bird observatory, and its small evening-only bar, there are no pubs or restaurants on the island. There is one shop, one school and a community hall used for meetings and social events. There is no police station on the island; the main station is Lerwick and a section station is located in the village of Brae.

Passenger service to the island is provided by SIC Ferries on the vessel Good Shepherd IV or by a nine-seat passenger aeroplane from Tingwall Airport near Lerwick, operated by regional carrier Directflight.

Electricity supply
Fair Isle is not connected to the National Grid; electricity is provided by the Fair Isle Electricity Company. From the 1980s, power was generated by two diesel generators and two wind turbines. Diesel generators were automatically switched off if wind turbines provided sufficient power. Excess capacity was distributed through a separate network for home heating, with remote frequency-sensitive programmable relays controlling water heaters and storage heaters in the buildings of the community. Following the installation of three wind turbines, combined with solar panels and batteries, in a £3.5 million scheme completed in October 2018, the island has had a 24-hour electricity supply.

Communication
Fair Isle is home to two GSM 900 MHz base stations operated by Vodafone and O2. On 16 April 2019, an EE 4G antenna was turned on by Openreach.

Emergency services
Fair Isle has a fire station equipped with a single fire appliance, and staffed by a retained fire crew of local volunteers. It was originally part of the Highlands and Islands Fire and Rescue Service, which was absorbed into the national Scottish Fire and Rescue Service on 1 April 2013. A locally organised volunteer fire brigade was formed in 1996 by island residents. This was later absorbed into the statutory fire service, with professional training provided, and the local service designated a retained fire crew. The first purpose-built fire engine was stationed to the island in 2002.

In October 2011, a contract for the construction of a £140,000 purpose-built fire station was awarded to Shetland company Ness Engineering, who completed the construction and equipping of the fire station, including its connection to the island power and water supplies, and the installation of a rainwater harvesting system within the building. The new fire station was officially opened on 14 March 2013.

There is a small Coastguard cliff-rescue team on the island. Like the fire service, the Coastguard is a retained (volunteer) emergency service. The Fair Isle Coastguard cliff rescue team were the first British Coastguard unit to be equipped with a quad ATV. The quad is painted in HM Coastguard livery, with reflective Battenburg markings and has an optional equipment trailer.

There are no emergency medical services on Fair Isle. Routine medical care is provided by a community nurse. In the event of accident and emergency the community nurse provides first aid until casualties can be removed to Shetland Mainland, usually by helicopter air ambulance. In severe weather conditions or life-threatening emergencies, the Coastguard helicopter can undertake the patient evacuation.

Transport

Air

Fair Isle Airport serves the island with flights to Tingwall Airport near Lerwick, and weekly to Sumburgh Airport, both on Shetland Mainland. Flights to Kirkwall on Orkney were scheduled to begin in September 2017, provided by Loganair. Private aircraft use the facility and scheduled flights arrive twice daily, three days a week. There is a small terminal building providing limited services. Fire cover is provided by the island fire service.

There are two helipads on the island; one at the South Fair Isle lighthouse and used by Northern Lighthouse Board and HM Coastguard helicopters, and the other at the North Fair Isle lighthouse.

Sea
There are two main harbours, north harbour and south harbour; both formed naturally, being sheltered by the headland of Bu Ness. They are separated by a narrow isthmus of gravel. The north harbour is the main route for goods, provisions, and Royal Mail postal services arriving at and departing from the island. The ferry Good Shepherd IV plies between Fair Isle north harbour and Grutness on Shetland Mainland. In summer only, the ferry also runs from Lerwick once every two weeks.

Road
A road connects the populated areas of the island, along its full length.

Education
Fair Isle has one primary school, with two classrooms. There is a full-time head teacher, and a part-time assistant teacher. The number of pupils varies over time, but has generally been between five and ten, with three pupils as of 2021. Islanders of secondary school age are generally educated off-island, on Shetland Mainland, where they board in halls of residence, returning to Fair Isle during holiday periods.

Religion
Christianity is the only formally organised religion on Fair Isle. There are two churches, one Methodist, and one Church of Scotland (Presbyterian). The Methodist Church has a resident non-stipendiary minister, who reports to a full-time minister on Shetland Mainland. The Methodist Church was constructed in 1886.

The Church of Scotland church was built in 1892. The Church of Scotland parish which contains Fair Isle is Dunrossness, which is linked with Sandwick, Cunningsburgh and Quarff parish. The congregation's minister is Reverend Charles H. Greig.

Climate
Fair Isle experiences an oceanic climate (Köppen Cfb), bordering on a subpolar oceanic climate (Cfc), with cool summers and mild winters. This 60+ year temperature span is actually smaller than many places in inland southern England will record within a given three-month period. To further illustrate how extreme the maritime moderation at Fair Isle is, a rural location near the coastline in Northern Stockholm County on a similar latitude in Sweden broke Fair Isle's all-time records in both directions within a 48-hour period between 26 and 28 April 2014.

Rainfall, at under , is lower than one might expect for somewhere often in the main path of Atlantic depressions. This is explained by a lack of heavy convective rainfall during spring and summer months due to the absence of warm surface conditions.

The  all-time low is uniquely mild for European locations on the 59th parallel north. The winter daily means are comparable to many areas as far south in the British Isles as south-central England, because of the extreme maritime moderation.

Conservation designations
Most of the island is designated by NatureScot as both a Site of Special Scientific Interest (SSSI) and a Special Area of Conservation (SCA). The island and its surrounding seas are also designated by NatureScot as a Special Protection Area (SPA) due to the important bird species present.

In 2016 the seas around Fair Isle were designated as a Marine Protected Area (MPA). As of 2019 it is the only MPA in Scotland to be designated specifically as a "Demonstration and Research" MPA. The aims of this MPA designation are defined as being:

Notable people 
 Ewen Thomson (born 1971 in Fair Isle), a Scottish luthier, specialising in violins, violas and cellos
 Inge Thomson (born 1974 in Fair Isle), a singer and multi instrumentalist
 Chris Stout (born 1976), a Scottish fiddle/violin player from Shetland; grew up in Fair Isle

Gallery

See also

 List of lighthouses in Scotland
 List of Northern Lighthouse Board lighthouses
 Foula
 List of Shetland islands

References

External links

 Fair Isle community website
 Fair Isle Blog
 Fair Isle bird observatory
 Latest bird sightings
 Fair Isle Electricity Company Ltd
 Details of its airport
 Photographic tour of the island
 NPR Story on Fair Isle
 Northern Lighthouse Board

 
Sites of Special Scientific Interest in Shetland
Birdwatching sites in Scotland
National Trust for Scotland properties
Shipping Forecast areas
Bird observatories in Scotland
Islands of Shetland
Underwater diving sites in Scotland
Marine Protected Areas of Scotland
Special Areas of Conservation in Scotland
Special Protection Areas in Scotland